Birse Group was a construction and civil engineering company based in North Yorkshire, England. It was acquired by Balfour Beatty in 2006 who retired the brand in 2014.

History
The company was founded by Peter Birse as the Birse Group in Doncaster 1970. It was the subject of an initial public offering in 1989 with Bilfinger Berger acquiring a 15% shareholding at that time. It was acquired by Balfour Beatty for £32 million in June 2006 and integrated into Balfour Beatty in January 2014.

Notable projects
Notable projects included:

 Mulberry Place completed in 1992
 West Stand at Old Trafford in Manchester, completed in 1993
 Reebok Stadium in Bolton completed in 1997
 Restoration of the Royal Exchange, Manchester completed in 1998
 Madejski Stadium in Reading completed in 1998
 Walkers Stadium in Leicester completed in 2002
 KC Stadium in Kingston upon Hull completed in 2002
 BBC Yorkshire headquarters in Leeds completed in 2004

References

External links
Birse Civils

Companies based in Doncaster
Companies formerly listed on the London Stock Exchange
Construction and civil engineering companies of England
Construction and civil engineering companies established in 1970
1970 establishments in England
2014 disestablishments in England